Oswin Reagan Appollis (born 25 August 2001) is a South African soccer player currently playing as a midfielder for Pretoria Callies.

References

2001 births
Living people
South African soccer players
South Africa youth international soccer players
Association football midfielders
South African Premier Division players
National First Division players
Cape Town Spurs F.C. players
SuperSport United F.C. players
University of Pretoria F.C. players
Pretoria Callies F.C. players
South Africa under-20 international soccer players